is a Japanese writer. At age 75 she won the 148th Akutagawa Prize, making Kuroda the oldest winner in the history of the prize.

Biography

Kuroda was born in 1937 in Tokyo and attended Waseda University. While at Waseda University she started the journal Sajo (Sandcastles), where she published her fiction. She graduated from Waseda University with a degree in Japanese, then worked various jobs as a teacher, administrator, and copy editor while continuing to write fiction. In 1963 her story "Mari" ("Ball") won the 63rd Yomiuri Shimbun Short Story Newcomer Prize.

For decades Kuroda wrote stories that were published but did not win recognition in the form of literary awards. In 2012, nearly fifty years after her previous literary award, Kuroda won the Waseda Bungaku new writer competition for her experimental story a b sango, which was written mostly in hiragana rather than kanji, composed horizontally rather than vertically, and used no names or pronouns. The next year a b sango won the 148th Akutagawa Prize, making Kuroda, at age 75, the oldest winner in the prize's history.  The Akutagawa Prize committee was not unanimous in its decision, but committee members commended Kuroda's experimental style. In 2013 her story Kanjutai no odori, which she had written many years before a b sango, was published in book form.

Recognition
 1963 Yomiuri Shimbun Short Story Newcomer Prize
 2012 Waseda Bungaku New Writer Prize
 2013 148th Akutagawa Prize (2012下)

Bibliography

Books in Japanese
 Ruiseitai meijaku, Shinbisha, 2010, 
 a b sango, Waseda Bungakkai, 2013,  
 Kanjutai no odori : sanbyakugojūban, Bungeishunjū, 2013,

Selected work in English
 "From Ball", translated by Angus Turvill, Comparative Critical Studies, 2015
 "Waymarkers", translated by Asa Yoneda, Words Without Borders, 2015

References

1937 births
Living people
21st-century Japanese novelists
21st-century Japanese women writers
Japanese women novelists
Akutagawa Prize winners
Waseda University alumni
Writers from Tokyo